Kambhamvaripalle is a village in Annamayya district of the Indian state of Andhra Pradesh. It is the mandal headquarters of Kambhamvaripalle mandal (Belongs To Piler Assembly Constituency). Garnimitta having famous Lord Yellamma Devi Temple. Every year in the month of May Lord Yellamma Devi Tirunala(Jatara) is being celebrated in grand way. In Garnimitta many shops are there like cloths, provisions, TV repair, Mobile shops, Vehicle repair, flower n fruits, Chicken shoes etc..Like mini town having Bank ATM, hospitals, Schools n colleges, Transport facilities etc..

References 

Mandal headquarters in Annamayya district
Villages in Annamayya district